Yamase (written: 山瀬) is a Japanese surname. Notable people with the surname include:

, Japanese footballer
, Japanese musician
, Japanese footballer

See also
Yamase Station, a railway station in Yoshinogawa, Tokushima Prefecture, Japan
Yamase Building, a building in Waimea, Kauai County, Hawaii

Japanese-language surnames